Coro (born in New York City) is an American Latin freestyle singer and actor of Cuban and Dominican heritage, who first had roles in numerous episodes of the star's hit television series, Miami Vice. While appearing on Vice, (Jose) Coro struggled to put together a group to get his singing career off the ground. His first efforts never took off, but in 1987, Coro met Stevie B, who was enjoying the success of his first hit record and getting ready to tour. After a stint as a backup vocalist and dancer for Stevie B, the New York-born and Miami-raised Coro made the move back to his native Manhattan to initiate a solo singing career.

Coro partnered with freestyle music producers Zahid Tariq, Ziggy Gonzalez and Todd Terry in 1989,. Coro's first single, "Where Are You Tonight", became a popular dance song in New York and Miami. The song reached the Top 25 on Billboard 's club chart and put Coro on the road doing shows in dance clubs across the country. On his self-titled debut album, Coro collaborated with producers Zahid Tariq and Ziggy Gonzalez to create a selection of uptempo dance tunes like "Can't Let You Go", "Where Are You tonight", "My Fallen Angel" and ballads such as "Missing You".

Discography

Studio album

Singles

Video clips

References

American freestyle musicians
20th-century Dominican Republic male singers
Living people
Charisma Records artists
20th-century American male singers
20th-century American singers
Musicians from Miami
Singers from New York City
Year of birth missing (living people)